KJLR-LP (UHF channel 28) was a low-power TV station based in Little Rock, Arkansas, broadcasting programming from AMGTV.  It was once an affiliate of Urban America Television prior to that network suspending its operations indefinitely. The station was the only one operating in Little Rock that was unavailable on local cable systems.  As a low-power station, its broadcast area was also mostly limited in comparison to other stations in the city, with viewership not far beyond Pulaski County.

The station's license was cancelled by the Federal Communications Commission on June 6, 2013, due to KJLR-LP being silent since January 30, 2012.

External links

JLR-LP
Television channels and stations established in 1990
Defunct television stations in the United States
Television channels and stations disestablished in 2013
1990 establishments in Arkansas
2013 disestablishments in Arkansas
JLR-LP